Entomorph: Plague of the Darkfall is a 1995 action-adventure role-playing video game by Strategic Simulations, Inc. It was re-released in 2013 on GOG.com.

Gameplay
In Entomorph, the player controls the character Warrick.

Plot

Publication history
It is the second video game based in the fictional universe World of Aden, the first being World of Aden: Thunderscape.  (Though both games share the same setting, Entomorph is not a sequel to Thunderscape.)

Reception

Writing for PC Gamer US, Trent Ward called Entomorph "an attractive, innovative break from the usual RPG fare." The reviewer for Next Generation called the game a "refreshing mixture" of mechanics and praised its graphics and music, but found fault with its control scheme and combat system.

In Computer Gaming World, Scorpia wrote that the game "probably does not have enough of any one element to satisfy fans of a particular genre", but that it "does work fairly well with what it has". The magazine included Entomorph in its holiday 1995 buyer's guide, where a writer noted that "the action and unique story will provide gamers with an interesting, and different, CRPG".

Chris Anderson of PC Zone considered Entomorph to be an attempt to compete with Ultima VIII, and he found it unsuccessful in this regard. However, he summarized the game as "good and reasonably big, with a fairly engrossing storyline". Fusions Dave Harris called the game "a good beginner's RPG" and "an excellent adjunct to Thunderscape". In PC Format, Mark Ramshaw agreed with Anderson that the game fell short of Ultima VIII, particularly in its graphics. However, he wrote, "That said, it's expansive, it's slick, the plot contains thrills, adventure and genuine humour, and the insect theme is a winner. Make no mistake, Entomorph really isn't half bad."

Andy Butcher reviewed Entomorph: Plague of the Darkfall for Arcane magazine, rating it a 7 out of 10 overall. Butcher comments that "Entomorph'''s a fun, engaging game that stresses puzzle-solving over endless combat, and the original (compared to most computer games, at least) story offers a lot more interest than yet another dungeon trek."

In his book Dungeons and Desktops: The History of Computer Role-Playing Games (2008), the video game historian Matt Barton called Entomorph and its companion World of Aden: Thunderscape'' "well-crafted and highly playable games [that] attracted little interest from CRPG fans then or now."

References

External links

Review at Just Adventure+

1995 video games
Classic Mac OS games
Role-playing video games
Single-player video games
Video game sequels
Video games about insects
Video games developed in the United States
Windows games
Mindscape games
Cyberlore Studios games